The Pine Street Historic District is a residential historic district on the south side of Providence, Rhode Island.  It extends along Pine Street between Seekell and Myrtle Streets, and includes properties east of Pine and north of Pearl Street on Friendship, Prince, Maple, and Stewart Streets.  The district represents an enclave of 19th-century residential housing in an area otherwise affected by urban renewal activities.

The district was listed on the National Register of Historic Places in 1978.

See also

National Register of Historic Places listings in Providence, Rhode Island

References

Historic districts in Providence County, Rhode Island
Geography of Providence, Rhode Island
National Register of Historic Places in Providence, Rhode Island
Historic districts on the National Register of Historic Places in Rhode Island